Marc Menant (born 11 February 1949) is a French writer and journalist.

Menant began his career as a sports reporter for RTL. He then joined TF1 and Antenne 2, where he hosted the show Les Jeux de 20 heures and was the weather presenter for Antenne 2's News Channel. From 1997 until 2008 he worked as a Europe 1.

Since 2008, Menant has been a radio host on Direct 8. In addition, he is also currently hosts the show Partageons nos idées on BFM TV.

Radio
 Since 2014 : Les pieds dans le plat on Europe 1

External links
  Site officiel de Marc Menant

1949 births
Living people
People from Yvelines
French male non-fiction writers
French television journalists
French radio journalists
French radio presenters
French television presenters